is a railway station on the Keio Inokashira Line in Setagaya, Tokyo, Japan, operated by the private railway operator Keio Corporation.

Lines

Service pattern
Only all-stations "Local" services stop at this station.

Station layout

The station consists of a ground-level island platform serving two tracks, with the station building built above the tracks. On both the east and west ends (toward Shibuya and Kichijoji respectively), the exits are served by over-track bridges, between which is the station building. There are elevators from the south side of the east end of the station to the ground-level exit, and also between the ticket gate area and platforms.

The platform was previously only long enough to accommodate four 18-meter cars, with roads crossing the tracks at either end, and the station building on the western end. Later, the crossing on the eastern end was closed, the platform extended, and the existing station building was closed and rebuilt as an above-track station.

Platforms

History
The station opened on August 1, 1933.

From 22 February 2013, station numbering was introduced on Keio lines, with Higashi-matsubara Station becoming "IN07".

Passenger statistics
In fiscal 2011, the station was used by an average of 18,374 passengers daily.

The passenger figures for previous years are as shown below.

Surrounding area

References

External links

 Higashi-matsubara Station information (Keio) 

Railway stations in Japan opened in 1933
Stations of Keio Corporation
Keio Inokashira Line
Railway stations in Tokyo